Slightly Scarlet may refer to:

 Slightly Scarlet (1930 film), a film starring Evelyn Brent
 Slightly Scarlet (1956 film), a film noir starring John Payne